Swanton may refer to:

People 
 Swanton (surname)

Places 

United Kingdom
 Swanton Abbott, village in Norfolk
 Swanton Morley, village in Norfolk
 Swanton Novers, village in Norfolk

United States
 Swanton, California, a small unincorporated community
 Swanton, Maryland, an unincorporated town
 Swanton, Nebraska, a village
 Swanton Township, Lucas County, Ohio
 Swanton, Ohio, a village
 Swanton (town), Vermont
 Swanton (village), Vermont, within the town

See also
 Swanson (disambiguation)
 Swanston (disambiguation)